The 2018 James Madison Dukes football team represented James Madison University during the 2018 NCAA Division I FCS football season. They were led by third-year head coach Mike Houston and played their home games at Bridgeforth Stadium. They were a member of the Colonial Athletic Association (CAA). They finished the season 9–4, 6–2 in CAA play to finish in second place. They received an at-large bid to the FCS Playoffs where they defeated Delaware in the first round before losing to Colgate in the second round.

On December 7, 2018, Mike Houston was formally announced and hired as the next coach of East Carolina, alongside nine staff members.

Previous season
The Dukes finished the 2017 season 14–1, 8–0 in CAA play to become CAA champions. They finished the regular season undefeated for the second time in school history (the other being 1975, before the Dukes joined the NCAA). In the FCS Playoffs they defeated Stony Brook, Weber State, and South Dakota State to advance to the FCS National Championship Game for the second consecutive year. They were unable to defend their 2016 National Championship, falling in the 2017 title game to North Dakota State.

Preseason

CAA Poll
In the CAA preseason poll released on July 24, 2018, the Dukes were predicted to win the CAA championship.

Preseason All-CAA Team
The Dukes had six players selected to the preseason all-CAA team, including cornerback Rashad Robinson being selected as preseason defensive player of the year.

Offense

Marcus Marshall – RB

Jahee Jackson – OL

Defense

Darrious Carter – DL

Jimmy Moreland – DB

Rashad Robinson – DB

Special teams

Harry O'Kelly – P

Award watch lists

Schedule

Source:

Game summaries

at NC State

at Norfolk State

Due to inclement weather, the JMU–Norfolk State game was mutually ended after the first quarter.

Robert Morris

William & Mary

at Richmond

Elon

at Villanova

Stony Brook

at New Hampshire

Rhode Island

at Towson

FCS Playoffs

Delaware–First Round

at Colgate–Second Round

Ranking movements

Players drafted into the NFL

References

James Madison
James Madison Dukes football seasons
James Madison
James Madison Dukes football